Calligraphidia tessellata is a moth in the family Noctuidae. It was first described by George Hamilton Kenrick in 1917 and is known from Madagascar.

The forewings of this species are brown with a violet shade, the costa with a series of dark brown spots; an ochreous-basal patch, irrorated (sprinkled) with black, followed by an irregular double violet line, an indistinct dark median line and a strongly marked dark postmedian line. The wingspan of this species is 50 mm.

References

Moths described in 1917
Calpinae